Santa Ana del Chiquiburitac Mission Site is a historic mission site located in Ironwood Forest National Monument, west of Tucson, Arizona.

It was built in 1811 and added to the National Register in 1975.

The site is within the Ironwood Forest National Monument.

See also

 Los Robles Archaeological District
 Cocoraque Butte Archaeological District

References

Roman Catholic churches in Arizona
Catholic Church in Arizona
Archaeological sites on the National Register of Historic Places in Arizona
Roman Catholic churches completed in 1811
Roman Catholic churches in Tucson, Arizona
Churches in Pima County, Arizona
National Register of Historic Places in Tucson, Arizona
19th-century Roman Catholic church buildings in the United States